For other people named Richard Carlson, see Richard Carlson (disambiguation).

Richard Carlson (June 17, 1944) is the current Kansas Secretary of Transportation, a position in which he has served since 2016. Previously, between 2005 and 2015, he was a Republican member of the Kansas House of Representatives, representing the 61st district.  He was given a 100% evaluation by the American Conservative Union

Early life and career
Carlson is a native of St. Marys, Kansas. He studied business and economics at Kansas State University and later served in the Kansas Army National Guard. Before Carlson was elected to the legislature, he served as the Pottawatomie County Commissioner between 1993 and 2005. He also served on the board of the Flint Hills Regional Leadership Program.

After leaving the legislature, Carlson worked as a legislative liaison and tax policy advisor for the Kansas Department of Revenue.

Kansas House of Representatives

Committee assignments

2013-14 session
 Taxation (Chairman)
 Appropriations
 Commerce, Labor and Economic Development

2011-12 session
 Taxation (Chairman)
 Appropriations
 Federal and State Affairs
 Pensions, Investments and Benefits

2009-10 session
 Taxation (Chairman)
 Education Budget
 Federal and State Affairs
 Pensions, Investments and Benefits
 Select Committee on KPERS

Kansas Secretary of Transportation
After Mike King resigned to pursue a career in the private sector, Governor Sam Brownback appointed Carlson to serve as interim Kansas Secretary of Transportation on July 18, 2016. On October 24, 2016, Brownback announced that he would nominate Carlson for the official cabinet role. He was confirmed for the position by the Kansas State Senate in July 2017.

External links

 Kansas Legislature - Richard Carlson
 Project Vote Smart profile
 Kansas Votes profile
 Campaign contributions: 2004, 2006, 2008

Republican Party members of the Kansas House of Representatives
Living people
State cabinet secretaries of Kansas
1944 births
21st-century American politicians
Kansas State University alumni